CINEC Campus is Sri Lanka's private institute of higher education. It is registered as a private limited liability company under the Companies Act. It is also the largest maritime educational training facility approved by the Directorate of Merchant shipping in Sri Lanka. Established in 1990, CINEC Campus is located in the quiet suburbs of Malabe with branches in Colombo, Jaffna and Trincomalee. Recently CINEC opened two overseas branches of the campus namely at Fiji and Seychelles.

CINEC Campus caters to over 20,000 students annually, who follow a range of over 200 Educational and training programs.

References

External links
 The Colombo International Nautical and Engineering College website

Educational institutions established in 1990
1990 establishments in Sri Lanka
Universities in Sri Lanka